Hsia-Fei Chang (born 1973 in Taipei) is Taiwanese artist. She currently lives and works in Paris.

Work 
Chang practice includes performance, installation, photography and text, and focuses mainly on identity and stereotypes.

Collections 
Her work is present in the permanent collections of the Fonds régional d'art contemporain Occitanie Montpellier and the Centre national des arts plastiques among others.

Bibliography 
 Hsia-Fei Chang, La biographie de Sandra, Paris: Onestar Press, 2004
Hsia-Fei Chang, 32 portraits: Place Du Tertre, Montmartre, Paris: Onestar Press; Paris: Galerie Laurent Godin, 2006. 
Sofia Eliza Bouratsis, Mehdi Brit, Enrico Lunghi, Hsia-Fei Chang: goodbye, Marseille: Editions P, 2015.

References

External links 

 Official website

1973 births
Living people
21st-century French women artists
Feminist artists